Persuasion (Kara Killgrave, formerly known as the Purple Girl and the Purple Woman) is a fictional mutant superhero appearing in American comic books published by Marvel Comics.

Fictional character biography
Zebediah Killgrave, the Purple Man, used his powers on a woman named Melanie to force her to marry him. Eventually, Killgrave realized that he was actually in love with Melanie and released her from his control. Becoming aware of what he had done, Melanie rejected Killgrave and he left. Soon after, Melanie returned to Toronto, but learned she was pregnant. She successfully gave birth to a daughter, Kara.

At the onset of puberty, Kara's whole body turned purple. When she revealed her plight to her mother, Melanie Killgrave, her mother revealed to Kara the identity of her father. Unable to cope with her change in appearance and the circumstances of her conception, Kara ran off.

She made her way to a skiing exhibition, where her sporting hero Jean-Paul Beaubier was scheduled to make an appearance. While in a washroom, preparing to meet him, a young woman repeatedly banged on the cubicle door. In anger, she told the woman to, "go jump off a cliff." The woman, unable to control herself, did exactly that and had to be saved by Beaubier. In doing so, he had no choice but to reveal his secret identity as Northstar to everyone in the vicinity. When Beaubier realised that Kara was responsible for the woman's actions, he berated her, but she took control of him and commanded him to take her to a desert island. While swimming on the island, Northstar had to rescue Kara from a crocodile. In the process, Kara lost her control over him when he went underwater. Northstar took her to Tamarind Island, the headquarters of Alpha Flight. Believing that Alpha Flight intended to harm her, she took control of the whole team and escaped, taking Madison Jeffries with her. While on the run, they were captured by the Auctioneer. Alpha Flight rescued them, and Heather Hudson decided to recruit Kara as the first member of a new Beta Flight. Kara started a brief romance with the second member to be recruited, Manikin.

Beta Flight

Kara became a valued member of Beta and Alpha Flights and fought alongside them in battles against such foes as the Dreamqueen, the Great Beasts, the Derangers, Scramble, China Force, and what she believed to be her own father's reanimated corpse. After being injured in battle with China Force and being left behind by Alpha Flight, who had gone to confront the Dreamqueen, she decided to quit the team, believing she had been abandoned.

When she decided to return to the group, she was contacted by Talisman, who was recruiting a team to rescue Northstar from Asgard. After the completion of this mission, she became a member of Beta Flight again under a re-structured Department H. She struck a close friendship with most members, especially Goblyn, Pathway, and Witchfire. In a supposed training team, she found herself in battle on a number of occasions. During this time, she fought against villains such as Firebug, the Jackal, Omega Flight, the Master, and the Hardliners.

Following the Joshua Lord incident and the disbanding of Department H, she was imprisoned in Neverland, the mutant concentration camp created by Weapon X under Malcolm Colcord. She was one of the exceptions after House of M who retained her powers.

While still in training, Box (Madison Jeffries) had her assist him against the composite being known as Omega. Kara was able to compel it to separate back into Box (Roger Bochs) and Scramble, but Scramble then lobotomized Bochs and reformed Omega. Madison was then forced to kill Omega.

Kara returned home with her friends Goblyn and Laura Dean. Much later, Persuasion was one of the mutants who had retained their mutant abilities after M-Day. Kara was seen celebrating the holidays in San Francisco with the X-Men and other mutants still remaining after M-Day.

Fear Itself
During the Fear Itself storyline, Kara allied herself with the anti-government Citadel to steal a server that would reveal the truth about the Unity Party running to form government in Canada. She was taken down by Alpha Flight members. The Unity Party, secretly working for Master of the World, took office and brainwashed Kara with the "Unity" program to join the group Alpha Strike.  Alpha Strike is formed after the Unity Government deems Alpha Flight a threat and included many villains gathered by Vindicator and Department H to spread the "Unity" program and to take down Alpha Flight. In battle with Alpha Flight, Kara is captured by the heroic team and strapped into a machine so her powers can be used to stop the brainwashing caused through the "Unity" program. Later, she shows up imprisoned in Pace Penitentiary and is visited by Hope Summers, who replicates her mind manipulation powers.

Jessica Jones The Purple Daughter
Kara resurfaces later in New York City. She is knocked out, drowned (to neutralize her pheromone-based powers), and slammed into the ground in a surprise attack by Jessica Jones, who believes Kara has something to do with her daughter Danielle's skin turning purple. After regaining consciousness and gaining awareness of the situation, she tells Jones she had nothing to do with Danielle's skin turning purple. Jessica Jones apologizes for pummeling Kara, noting she has issues with Kara's powers and purple face due to past traumatic experiences with her father, The Purple Man. Kara gives Jones some words of advice about her daughter. Unbeknownst to them, the Purple Children are watching them from a distance and report their findings to an unknown assailant.

Later, when they're supposed to meet, Jessica is attacked by Kara from behind, who is (ironically) being mind-controlled herself. Jessica defensively throws her off with force, breaking Kara's arm in the process. Kara continues the attack and Jessica has no choice but to knock her out. After the serum used to control Kara wears off, she joins her siblings the Purple Children in keeping their father the Purple Man unconscious so he will not escape. Jessica later thanks them all for helping her.

Joining The Thunderbolts 
Seeking redemption, Kara joins the new Thunderbolts team led by Luke Cage and Hawkeye, fighting under the name Persuasion.

Powers and abilities
Persuasion can control a person through the use of pheromones, reducing them to a near-mindless state, extremely receptive to suggestion. A side effect of her power is that the people she controls turn purple temporarily. Upon recovery from Kara's power, her victims usually have a splitting headache. Persuasion's powers apparently cannot affect the body's involuntary systems. An order to "drop dead" would only result in the loss of consciousness. She can steal control of people from other mind controllers such as Mesmero. Her power can be nullified by encasing Kara in plastic or other forms of airtight imprisonment (thus preventing her pheromones from affecting others), as does submerging the affected person.

Over time, her powers grew to the extent that she could control people without saying a word. She also extended her range of control for several miles. At one point, Kara controlled all of Alpha Flight. Kara can create a mindlink with people, making their minds one. This was never fully explained, but it was stated that she could merge her mind with whomever she wanted. She once merged her mind with a living planet, but it was too much for her and couldn't keep the connection for long.

Other versions

Age of Apocalypse
In the Age of Apocalypse timeline, Persuasion joins with a group of low-level telepaths to create a kind of "psychic pyramid scheme" known as the Overmind which Quentin Quire, the mastermind behind the Overmind, uses to increase his own limited skills. Persuasion and the telepaths that compose the Overmind are later confronted and killed by the Shadow King.

References

External links
 AlphaFlight.Net Alphanex Entry on - Persuasion

Comics characters introduced in 1986
Fictional characters from Ontario
Fictional offspring of rape
Marvel Comics telepaths
Marvel Comics mutants
Characters created by Bill Mantlo
Marvel Comics female superheroes